According to the Book of Ether in the Book of Mormon, Akish was a prominent figure among the Jaredites. 

In the book's narrative, Akish first established secret combinations, nearly destroying their civilization. Omer was the legitimate king at the time, however,  Omer's son Jared desired to take the throne earlier, and employed a scheme devised by his daughter (Omer's granddaughter) to do so. Jared's daughter danced for Akish who then desired to marry her. Jared agreed, on the condition that Akish "will bring unto me the head of... the king." Akish gathered Jared's kinsmen, had them swear an oath to follow him and agree that anyone revealing the plan would be killed. (Ether 8:7, 14) Akish and those loyal to him took the kingdom from Omer. However, Omer and his children (who had not plotted against him) fled past the hill Shem to a place called Ablom along the seashore. Jared became the king, but Akish plotted against him too and had Jared himself killed.

Etymology
Akîsh may be a transliteration of אָכִישׁ (Achish in the King James Bible). David Rohl writes that the name may be a shortened form of Akishimige, a Hurrian name meaning "the Sun God has given". Before the strong influence of this dialect of Aramaic over Hebrew, which occurred after the Babylonian invasion, אָכִישׁ would (if the vowels are right) have been pronounced "Akîsh".

In the seventh-century B.C. Ekron inscription the name "Akîsh" appears as "son of Padi, son of Ysd, son of Ada, son of Ya'ir"; Akîsh by then held enough authority in Ekron to dedicate a temple. A similar name (IKAUSU) appears as a king of Ekron in seventh-century B.C. Assyrian inscriptions, as does Padi. Scholars agree that these two are the same men, although a royal status cannot yet be confirmed for their ancestors Ysd, Ada, and Ya'ir.

This appears to indicate that either the name "Akish" was a common name for Philistine kings, used both at Gath and Ekron, or, as Naveh has suggested, that the editor of the biblical text used a known name of a Philistine king from the end of the Iron Age (Achish of Ekron) as the name of a king(s) of Gath in narratives relating to earlier periods.

Family

References
 Pinegar, Ed J. & Allen, Richard J. Book of Mormon Who's Who

Book of Mormon people